Paul Richard Coulson (born April 1952) is an Irish billionaire, who is the largest shareholder and chairman of Ardagh Group. In 2021, his fortune was estimated to be $2.8 billion, making him Ireland's 10th most wealthy person.

Education 
Coulson received a bachelor's degree in business studies from Trinity College Dublin in 1973. He qualified as a chartered accountant in 1978, after five years spent with Price Waterhouse, and is an FCA.

Career 
In 1982, Coulson founded an investment and aircraft leasing firm company, Yeoman International Group Limited.

In 1998, he bought a stake in the Irish Glass Bottle Company and transformed it into Ardagh Group.

Personal life 
Coulson resides in London and New York

References

1952 births
Irish billionaires
Living people
Alumni of Trinity College Dublin